What'd I Say is an album by American musician Ray Charles, released by Atlantic Records in late 1959. His sixth album since the debut Ray Charles in 1957, What'd I Say compiled a range of Charles' material, including his first top 10 hit, the title track "What'd I Say".  The album became his first gold record., and is included in Robert Christgau's "Basic Record Library" of 1950s and 1960s recordings, published in Christgau's Record Guide: Rock Albums of the Seventies (1981).

Though routinely classified as a standard album, at the time of its 1959 release, it was more of a compilation of previously uncollected Charles material. It included recent singles ("That's Enough", "Tell Me How Do You Feel", "What'd I Say", all from 1959; and "My Bonnie", "Rockhouse", "What Kind Of Man Are You", "You Be My Baby", "Tell All The World About You" all issued in 1958), and tracks that had initially been issued as singles as far back as 1952 ("Roll With My Baby") and 1953 ("Jumpin' In The Mornin'").

Critical reception

Upon its release, a reviewer for Billboard referred to What'd I Say as "A fine, swinging album," and wrote that Charles "is at his best here."

Track listing

Notes
 On later reissues and some digital platforms, "What'd I Say" is listed as being in two parts: "What'd I Say – Part I" and "What'd I Say – Part II", or "What'd I Say (Pts. 1 and 2)"; "Rockhouse" is similarly listed as "Rockhouse – Part I" and "Rockhouse – Part II", or "Rockhouse (Pts. 1 and 2)".

Personnel

 Ray Charles – piano (all tracks), Wurlitzer electronic piano (track 1), Hammond organ (track 4), vocals (all tracks)
 David Newman – tenor saxophone, alto saxophone (tracks 1, 3, 4, 5, 6, 8, 9, 10)
 Emmett Dennis – baritone saxophone (tracks 3, 5, 6, 8, 9, 10)
 Bennie Crawford – alto saxophone, baritone saxophone (tracks 1, 4)
 Marcus Belgrave – trumpet (tracks 3, 4, 8, 9)
 Lee Harper – trumpet (tracks 3, 8, 9)
 Ricky Harper – trumpet (tracks 5, 10)
 Joe Bridgewater – trumpet (tracks 5, 6, 10)
 John Hunt – trumpet (tracks 4, 6)

 Edgar Willis – double bass (tracks 1, 3, 4, 5, 8, 9, 10)
 Roosevelt Sheffield – double bass (track 6)
 Richie Goldberg – drums (tracks 3, 8, 9)
 William Peeples – drums (tracks 5, 6, 10)
 Teagle Fleming – drums (track 4)
 Milt Turner – drums (track 1)
 Mary Ann Fisher – vocals (tracks 5, 10)
 The Raelettes – backing vocals (tracks 1, 3, 5, 8, 9, 10)
 unknown – trumpet, saxophone, double bass, drums (tracks 2, 7)

Technical
 Marvin Israel – cover design
 Lee Friedlander – cover photography

References

External links 
 

Ray Charles albums
1959 albums
Albums produced by Jerry Wexler
Albums produced by Ahmet Ertegun
Atlantic Records albums